The 1968 London–Sydney Marathon, officially Daily Express-Daily Telegraph London-Sydney Marathon was the first running of the London-Sydney Marathon. The rally took place between the 24th of November and the 17th of December 1968. The event covered 10,373 miles (16,694 km) through Europe, Asia and Australia. It was won by Andrew Cowan, Colin Malkin and Brian Coyle, driving a Hillman Hunter.

Background
The original Marathon was the result of a lunch in late 1967, during a period of despondency in Britain caused by the devaluation of the British pound. Sir Max Aitken, proprietor of the Daily Express, and two of his editorial executives, Jocelyn Stevens and Tommy Sopwith, decided to create an event which their newspaper could sponsor, and which would serve to raise the country's spirits. Such an event would, it was felt, act as a showcase for British engineering and would boost export sales in the countries through which it passed.

The initial UK£10,000 winner's prize offered by the Daily Express was soon joined by a £3,000 runners-up award and two £2,000 prizes for the third-placed team and for the highest-placed Australians, all of which were underwritten by the Daily Telegraph newspaper and its proprietor Sir Frank Packer, who was eager to promote the Antipodean leg of the rally.

Race action

Roger Clark established an early lead through the first genuinely treacherous leg, from Sivas to Erzincan in Turkey, averaging almost 60 mph in his Lotus Cortina for the 170-mile stage. Despite losing time in Pakistan and India, he maintained his lead to the end of the Asian section in Bombay, with Simo Lampinen's Ford Taunus second and Lucien Bianchi's DS21 in third.

However, once into Australia, Clark suffered several setbacks. A piston failure dropped him to third, and would have cost him a finish had he not been able to cannibalise fellow Ford Motor Company driver Eric Jackson's car for parts. After repairs were effected, he suffered what should have been a terminal rear differential failure. Encountering a Cortina by the roadside, he persuaded the initially reluctant owner to sell his rear axle and resumed once more, although at the cost of 80 minutes' delay while it was replaced.

This left Lucien Bianchi and co-driver Jean-Claude Ogier in the Citroën DS in the lead ahead of Gilbert Staepelaere/Simo Lampinen in the German Ford Taunus, with Andrew Cowan in the Hillman Hunter 3rd. Then Staepelaere's Taunus hit a gate post, breaking a track rod. This left Cowan in second position and Paddy Hopkirk's Austin 1800 in third place.

Approaching the Nowra checkpoint at the end of the penultimate stage with only  to Sydney, the leading Frenchmen were involved in a head-on collision with a motorist who mistakenly entered a closed course, wrecking their Citroën DS and hospitalising the pair.

Hopkirk, the first driver on the scene (ahead of Cowan on the road, but behind on penalties) stopped to tend to the injured and extinguish the flames in the burning cars. Andrew Cowan, next on the scene, also slowed but was waved through with the message that everything was under control. Hopkirk rejoined the rally, and neither he nor Cowan lost penalties in this stage. So Andrew Cowan, who had requested "a car to come last" from the Chrysler factory on the assumption that only half a dozen drivers would even reach Sydney, took victory in his Hillman Hunter and claimed the £10,000 prize. Hopkirk finished second, while Australian Ian Vaughan was third in a factory-entered Ford XT Falcon GT. Ford Australia won the Teams' Prize with their three Falcons GTs, placing 3rd, 6th and 8th.

The route
An eight-man organising committee was established to create a suitably challenging but navigable route. Jack Sears, organising secretary and himself a former racing driver, plotted a 7,000-mile course covering eleven countries in as many days, and arranged that the P&O liner SS Chusan would ferry the first 72 cars and their crews on the nine-day voyage from India, before the final 2,900 miles across Australia:

The remaining crews departed Bombay at 3 am on Thursday 5 December, arriving in Fremantle at 10 am on Friday 13 December before they restarted in Perth the following evening. Any repairs attempted on the car during the voyage would lead to the crew's exclusion.

Results

References

Notes

Bibliography

 
 
 

 

Rally raid races
Rally racing series
London-Sydney Marathon